Tadeusz Krzyżanowski (29 August 1920, in Osterfeld – 31 January 1987, in Gdańsk) was a Polish shot putter who competed in the 1952 Summer Olympics.

References

1920 births
1987 deaths
Polish male shot putters
Olympic athletes of Poland
Athletes (track and field) at the 1952 Summer Olympics
People from Burgenlandkreis
20th-century Polish people